Shrubland Hall, Coddenham, Suffolk, is a historic English country house with planned gardens in Suffolk, England, built in the 1770s.

The Hall was used as a health clinic in the second half of the 20th century and  briefly reopened as a hotel, restaurant and spa in 2015 but shut in early 2017.

The parkland and formal gardens of the hall are Grade I listed on the Register of Historic Parks and Gardens, and the hall itself is listed Grade II* on the National Heritage List for England.

History
The first recorded owner of the estate was Robert de Shrubeland, although there is evidence of occupation on the site since the Roman period. The previous Tudor-style Shrubland Hall was built by the Booth family in the early 16th century. The estate was later acquired by the Little family, and passed to the Bacon family when in 1581 Helen Little, daughter and heiress of Thomas Little (by his wife Elizabeth Lytton, a daughter and co-heiress of Sir Robert Lytton of Knebworth House in Hertfordshire), married Sir Edward Bacon (d.1618), the third son of Sir Nicholas Bacon, Lord Keeper of the Great Seal to Queen Elizabeth I, and a half-brother of the philosopher and statesman Sir Francis Bacon.

The present Grade II* listed hall was designed by James Paine for the Revd. John Bacon in the early 1770s. His heir was his younger brother Rev. Nicholas Bacon (d.1796), Vicar of Coddenham, who died without issue and was the last in the male line, whose funeral hatchment survives in Coddenham Church. It was then bought by Sir William Fowle Middleton, 1st Baronet, whose son and heir, Sir William Fowle Middleton, 2nd Baronet, commissioned architect John Gandy-Deering to remodel it in the early 1830s. There was further remodelling of the building for Sir William between 1849 and 1855 by Sir Charles Barry, who also created the terraced gardens. Paine's central block was built in 3 storeys with a 5 bay frontage, to which Gandy-Deering added 3 further bays to either side. The whole is constructed of Gault brick with dressings of limestone and stucco. The parkland was styled by Humphry Repton and still retains the deer park and walled garden.

After Sir William's death in 1860, the property passed to his cousin Sir George Nathaniel Broke Middleton, and from him in 1882 to his niece Jane Anne Broke, eldest daughter of Captain Charles Acton Vere-Broke, and her husband James Saumarez, 4th Baron de Saumarez. The Hall was used as a convalescent home during the First World War and the Old Hall as a brigade HQ during the Second World War. In the 1960s, the 6th Baron de Saumarez established a health clinic in the property which continued in the time of the 7th Baron.

Until then the Italian style gardens which include Grade II listed features were open to the public as a visitor attraction.

In 2010, the estate was sold in 42 separate lots. As of 2012, the Hall itself was used as residential quarters for the private higher education establishment, the British Institute of Technology & E-commerce (BITE) but in 2014 was re-opened as the luxury seven-star Boutique Health and Hotel. In 2015, the Hall was advertised for sale at an asking price of £6,500,000.

References

External links

Shrubland now
Shrubland Revisited, a website for sharing memories of Shrubland Hall

Country houses in Suffolk
Grade I listed parks and gardens in Suffolk
Grade II* listed buildings in Suffolk
Grade II* listed houses
Grade II listed buildings in Suffolk
Italianate architecture in England
Charles Barry buildings
Barham, Suffolk
Coddenham